Smiths News is a distributor of newspapers, magazines, books and consumables, headquartered in Swindon, England. The company, originally known as 'WHSmith News' was created and renamed Smiths News PLC on 1 September 2006 from the demerger of W H Smith plc. In April 2014, Smiths News PLC rebranded as Connect Group PLC to reflect the diversity of the Group's markets.

The Group purchased Tuffnells Parcels Express in late 2014 for more than £100m but sold it in 2020 for £15m after several years of poor performance under the group's stewardship.

In October 2020 Connect Group PLC reverted to Smiths News PLC signalling a return to the company's core competence and expertise. Smiths News PLC comprises: Smiths News, the UK's largest newspaper and magazine wholesaler; Dawson Media Direct, international media supplier to airlines and travel points; Instore, specialists in field-based marketing and supply chain auditing; Martin Lavell, leading corporate news distributor.

Demerger
On 12 April 2006, the board of WH Smith PLC announced its intention to demerge the retail and news distribution arms of the business into two separate companies.  The resulting companies are W H Smith PLC (continues as the retail arm), and Smiths News PLC (former news distribution arm). The demerger took effect on 30 August 2006.

Rebrands 
On 17 March 2014, Smiths News PLC announced it would be renamed Connect Group PLC. This took effect on 22 April 2014 .

The company changed brand again, in 2020, to Smith News plc.

References

External links

Companies listed on the London Stock Exchange
Logistics companies of the United Kingdom